Ollathumathi is a 1967 Indian Malayalam-language film directed by K. S. Sethumadhavan, produced by M. P. Chandrasekhara Pillai, starring Prem Nazir, Sathyan, Madhu and Sheela. The film has a musical score by L. P. R. Varma.

Cast

Prem Nazir
Sathyan
Madhu
Sheela
Adoor Bhasi
Muthukulam Raghavan Pillai
Sankaradi
Shobha
Shubha
T. R. Omana
T. S. Muthaiah
Adoor Pankajam
Bahadoor
G. K. Pillai
Indirarani
K. M. Warrier
K. P. Ummer
Kaduvakulam Antony
Kamaladevi
Kottarakkara Sreedharan Nair
M. G. Menon
Meena
S. P. Pillai
Susheela

Soundtrack
The music was composed by L. P. R. Varma with lyrics by Vayalar Ramavarma, Kumaranasan, Ramachandran, P. Bhaskaran,  and Thikkurissy Sukumaran Nair.

References

External links
 

1967 films
1960s Malayalam-language films
Films directed by K. S. Sethumadhavan